Volker Tulzer (24 June 1940 – 13 October 2005) was an Austrian middle-distance runner. He competed in the men's 1500 metres at the 1964 Summer Olympics.

References

External links

1940 births
2005 deaths
Athletes (track and field) at the 1964 Summer Olympics
Austrian male middle-distance runners
Olympic athletes of Austria
Place of birth missing